In post-tonal music theory, identity is similar to identity in universal algebra. An identity function is a permutation or transformation which transforms a pitch or pitch class set into itself. Generally this requires symmetry. For instance, inverting an augmented triad or C4 interval cycle, 048, produces itself. Performing a retrograde operation upon the tone row 01210 produces 01210. Doubling the length of a rhythm while doubling the tempo produces a rhythm of the same durations as the original.

In addition to being a property of a specific set, identity is, by extension, the "family" of sets or set forms which satisfy a possible identity. These families are defined by symmetry, which means that an object is invariant to any of various transformations; including reflection and rotation.

George Perle provides the following example:
"C-E, D-F, E-G, are different instances of the same interval [interval-4]...[an] other kind of identity...has to do with axes of symmetry [reflection symmetry rather than interval families' rotational symmetry]. C-E belongs to a family [sum-4] of symmetrically related dyads as follows:"

C=0, so in mod12, the interval-4 family:

Thus, in addition to being part of the sum-4 family, C-E is also a part of the interval-4 family (in contrast to sum families, interval families are based on difference).

See also
Klumpenhouwer network
Point reflection
Derived row
Twelve-tone technique#Invariance

References

Musical set theory